The 2022–23 Louisiana Ragin' Cajuns women's basketball team represents the University of Louisiana at Lafayette during the 2022–23 NCAA Division I women's basketball season. The Ragin' Cajuns, led by eleventh-year head coach Garry Brodhead, plays all home games at the Cajundome along with the Louisiana Ragin' Cajuns men's basketball team. They are members of the Sun Belt Conference.

Previous season 
The Ragin' Cajuns finished the 2021–22 season 18–7, 9–4 in Sun Belt play to finish third in the conference. They made it to the 2021-22 Sun Belt Conference women's basketball tournament where the ultimately lost to eventual tournament champions UT Arlington in the semifinals. They were not invited to any additional post-season play.

Offseason

Departures

Transfers

Roster

Schedule and results

|-
!colspan=9 style=| Exhibition
|-

|-
!colspan=9 style=| Non-conference Regular Season
|-

|-
!colspan=9 style=| Conference Regular season

|-
!colspan=9 style=| Sun Belt Tournament
|-

See also
 2022–23 Louisiana Ragin' Cajuns men's basketball team

References

Louisiana Ragin' Cajuns women's basketball seasons
Louisiana Ragin' Cajuns
Louisiana Ragin' Cajuns women's basketball
Louisiana Ragin' Cajuns women's basketball